Kim Sung-keon (born June 20, 1977) is a South Korean football player who, since 2008, has played for Suwon Samsung Bluewings (formerly Daejeon Citizen, Pohang Steelers and Jeonbuk Hyundai Motors).

Club career statistics

External links

1977 births
Living people
Association football defenders
South Korean footballers
Daejeon Hana Citizen FC players
Pohang Steelers players
Jeonbuk Hyundai Motors players
Suwon Samsung Bluewings players
K League 1 players
Footballers from Seoul
Footballers at the 1998 Asian Games
Asian Games competitors for South Korea